Let Each One Go Where He May is a 2009 film directed by American filmmaker Ben Russell. Composed of only thirteen shots, it follows a Surinamese man as he travels from the city to the forest.  Russell had served in the Peace Corp in Suriname.

References

External links

2009 films
Films set in Suriname
Films shot in Suriname
American avant-garde and experimental films
2000s avant-garde and experimental films
2009 drama films
2000s American films